Petar Zlatkov (born 3 May 1984) is a Bulgarian footballer currently playing for PFC Lokomotiv Mezdra as a forward.

References

Bulgarian footballers
1984 births
Living people
First Professional Football League (Bulgaria) players
PFC CSKA Sofia players
PFC Lokomotiv Mezdra players
Association football forwards